The 1926–27 Seconda Divisione was the first edition of a sub-national third level tournament within the Italian football championship.

In 1926 the ”Viareggio Charter” submitted the Italian football's organization to the fascist regime. The 60 best clubs of the country joined the two new national championships,  while the third level became the Seconda Divisione on sub-national bases. Clubs leagues were disbanded and substituted by some Authorities appointed by the fascists.

Regulations
The ”Northern Lower Divisions Directory”, which had its headquarters in Genoa, created a copy of the higher championship, the Prima Divisione. It was composed of three groups of ten clubs, a total of 30 teams. The winners of any group of the Northern Authority were promoted, while the last two teams should be relegated. A final for the title was planned.

The ”Southern Lower Divisions Directory”, which had its headquarters in Rome, organized its 28 teams into four groups. The winners of any group of Southern Authority qualified to the final group. The winner of the final group was promoted.

However, following numerous bankruptcies that involved every southern team in Prima Divisione except the Puglia's teams, were later promoted in Prima Divisione also Savoia and Tivoli. The other teams of the Second Division Southern League refused to be admitted in Prima Divisione.

Teams selection 
The old Northern Terza Divisione third-level championship had a regional structure with inter-regional finals, so it was decided to take the best clubs of these finals with the clubs eliminated from the disbanded Northern League.

In Southern Italy the situation was different. There, the previous reform of 1921-1922 did not take place, so the pyramid of 1912 had been maintained, with the Seconda Divisione, former Seconda Categoria, as the first tournament at the regional level. So, in a lexical continuity, the old Seconda Divisione remained the bulk of new one, including six promoted teams and the clubs eliminated from the disbanded Southern League, but with the difference of the elimination of the regional boundaries to adopt the inter-regional structure as the Northern counterpart.

Northern Authority

Group A

Carrarese promoted to Prima Divisione.
Valenzana admitted to Prima Divisione to fill a vacancy.
La Nicese and Genovese re-admitted to fill a vacancy.

Group B

Relegation playoff

Monza promoted to Prima Divisione.
Lecco admitted to Prima Divisione to fill a vacancy.
Abbiategrasso re-admitted to fill a vacancy.
Gonzaga relegated to Terza Divisione.

Group C

Ponziana promoted to Prima Divisione.
Pordenone disbanded after the end of the season.
Dolo re-admitted to fill a vacancy.
Copparese relegated to Terza Divisione.

Southern Authority

Group A

Tiferno qualified to the Southern finals.
Zara could not pay another season.
Stamura merged with stronger AC Ancona.
Tito Acerbo disbanded for bribery.
Perugia did not play this season, but they were re-admitted anyway.

Group B

Terni qualified to the Southern finals.
Tivoli firstly re-admitted, then resulting the sole club to apply for, they were admitted to Prima Divisione.
V.Goliarda did not play this season, but they were re-admitted anyway.

Group C

Savoia qualified to the Southern finals.
Maddalonese disbanded at the end of the season.
Cavese disbanded for bankruptcy.
Puteolana no more existed.

Group D

Messinese qualified to the Southern finals.
Reggio entered into a year-time break.

Southern Finals

Promotion playoff in Rome on July 17:TERNANA-Savoia 1-0

Terni promoted to Prima Divisione.
Savoia later promoted by the FIGC.

Championship Cup 
The group winners of Northern Italy played for the national title, because they were considered evidently stronger than the Southern clubs by the FIGC. However, Carrarese retired from this cup.

Monza Champions of Second Division 1927.

Notes 

1926-1927
3